The 26th parallel south latitude is a circle of latitude that is 26 degrees south of Earth's equatorial plane. It crosses the Atlantic Ocean, Africa, the Indian Ocean, Australia, the Pacific Ocean and South America.

Around the world
Starting at the Prime Meridian and heading eastwards, the parallel 26° south passes through:

{| class="wikitable plainrowheaders"
! scope="col" width="125" | Co-ordinates
! scope="col" | Country, territory or ocean
! scope="col" | Notes
|-
| style="background:#b0e0e6;" | 
! scope="row" style="background:#b0e0e6;" | Atlantic Ocean
| style="background:#b0e0e6;" |
|-
| 
! scope="row" | 
|
|-
| 
! scope="row" | 
| Northern Cape
|-
| 
! scope="row" | 
|
|-valign="top"
| 
! scope="row" | 
| North West Gauteng - passing just north of Johannesburg Mpumalanga
|-
| 
! scope="row" | 
|
|-
| 
! scope="row" | 
|
|-
| style="background:#b0e0e6;" | 
! scope="row" style="background:#b0e0e6;" | Indian Ocean
| style="background:#b0e0e6;" | Maputo Bay - passing just south of Maputo, 
|-
| 
! scope="row" | 
| Inhaca Island
|-
| style="background:#b0e0e6;" | 
! scope="row" style="background:#b0e0e6;" | Indian Ocean
| style="background:#b0e0e6;" |
|-
| 
! scope="row" | 
| Western Australia - Dirk Hartog Island
|-
| style="background:#b0e0e6;" | 
! scope="row" style="background:#b0e0e6;" | Indian Ocean
| style="background:#b0e0e6;" | Shark Bay
|-
| 
! scope="row" | 
| Western Australia - Peron Peninsula
|-
| style="background:#b0e0e6;" | 
! scope="row" style="background:#b0e0e6;" | Indian Ocean
| style="background:#b0e0e6;" | L'Haridon Bight, Shark Bay
|-
| 
! scope="row" | 
| Western Australia - Peron Peninsula
|-
| style="background:#b0e0e6;" | 
! scope="row" style="background:#b0e0e6;" | Indian Ocean
| style="background:#b0e0e6;" | Hamelin Pool, Shark Bay
|-
| 
! scope="row" | 
| Western Australia Western Australia / Northern Territory border (~127 metres at Surveyor Generals Corner on the 129th meridian east)Northern Territory / South Australia borderSouth Australia / Queensland border (from Poeppel Corner on the 138th meridian east)Queensland (from Haddon Corner on the 141st meridian east)
|-
| style="background:#b0e0e6;" | 
! scope="row" style="background:#b0e0e6;" rowspan="2" | Pacific Ocean
| style="background:#b0e0e6;" | Coral Sea
|-
| style="background:#b0e0e6;" | 
| style="background:#b0e0e6;" |
|-
| 
! scope="row" | 
|
|-
| 
! scope="row" | 
|
|-
| 
! scope="row" | 
|
|-
| 
! scope="row" | 
|
|-valign="top"
| 
! scope="row" | 
| Paraná Santa Catarina
|-
| style="background:#b0e0e6;" | 
! scope="row" style="background:#b0e0e6;" | Atlantic Ocean
| style="background:#b0e0e6;" | 
|}

Australia

In Australia, the northernmost border of South Australia, and the southernmost border of the Northern Territory are defined by 26° south.

Additionally, 26° south also defines an approximately 127 metre section of the Western Australia/Northern Territory border at Surveyor Generals Corner due to inaccuracies in the 1920s for fixing positions under constraints of available technology.

The parallel also defines part of the Queensland and South Australia border between the 138th and 141st meridians east.

See also
25th parallel south
27th parallel south
Northern Territory borders
South Australian borders

References

s26
Borders of South Australia
Borders of the Northern Territory
Borders of Queensland
Borders of Western Australia